Biharilal Chakraborty was a Bengali poet and music composer. He is often considered as the pioneer of musical poetry in Bengali literature. He was born on 21 May 1835 at Jorabagan of Kolkata, in British India. He had profound knowledge of Bengali, English and Sanskrit. His notable collection of poetry includes Banga Darshan, Banga Sundari, Bandhu Biyog, Premabahini, Sangeet Shatak, Shadher Ashan, Nishargasandarshan, and Sharadamangal. He was editor of Purnima, Sahitya Shankranti and Obodhbondhu literary magazines. He died on 24 May 1894. Rabindranath Tagore was influenced by the works of Biharilal Chakraborty and named him "Morning Bird" of Bengali literature.

References 

1835 births
1894 deaths
Bengali male poets
19th-century Bengali poets
 Writers from Kolkata